Caersws is a village and community on the River Severn, in the Welsh county of Powys (Montgomeryshire)  west of Newtown, and halfway between Aberystwyth and Shrewsbury. It has a station on the Cambrian Line from Aberystwyth to Shrewsbury. At the 2011 Census, the community had a population of 1,586 – a  figure which includes the settlements of Clatter, Llanwnnog and Pontdolgoch. The village itself had a population of slightly over 800.

Etymology
The name is derived from the Welsh placename elements "Caer-" and "Sŵs". "Caer" translates as "fort" and likely refers to the Roman settlement. The derivation of the second element is less certain.

Thomas Pennant and later writers note that the fort was the termination of the Roman Road from Chester (via Meifod), the name of the road was Sarn Swsan or Sarn Swsog and it is thought that the town and the road share their etymology. The meaning of Swsan/Swsog is again, uncertain, but two local traditions hold that this is a personal name, either of a Queen Swswen (a name which may translate as "The Blessed/Pure Kiss") a Celtic leader who is said to have fought a battle in the vicinity around the time of the Roman occupation who was equated with Estrildis by Oliver Mathews, or it is named for a Roman lieutenant "Hesus".

Furthermore, the linguist John Rhys noted that the dialect of Mid-Wales Welsh (Y Bowyseg) was closer to the Gaulish language than its neighbours, and concluded that the area had pre-Roman links to Gaul. This may suggest a link between Caersŵs and the God Esus venerated by the Parisii and Treverii.

Other suggested etymologies include the name retaining a Roman-era dedication to Zeus, and the fact that "sws" (not sŵs) can be literally translated to "Kiss" in modern Welsh has led to a number of developing folk etymologies.

History

Caersws was the location of two Roman forts of Roman Wales. Although the Mediolanum of the Antonine Itinerary has since been identified as Whitchurch in Shropshire, Caersws is sometimes identified as the Mediolanum among the Ordovices described in Ptolemy's Geography, although others argue for Llanfyllin or Meifod. Further, this second Mediolanum may be identical or distinct from the "Mediomanum" ( "Central Hand") mentioned by the Ravenna Cosmography.

Governance
An electoral ward in the same name exists. This ward includes the community of Carno and at the 2011 Census had a population of 2,316.

Buildings

Llanwnnog Church in the community of Caersws is a single-chambered structure, variously considered to date from the 13th or 15th century and restored in 1863. It contains a 15th or 16th century rood screen and loft in Montgomeryshire, a medieval font bowl and one 17th century memorial. Maesmawr Hall was built in the early 19th century.

Sport
Downhill Mountain Biking has flourished in forestry at Henblas farm, to the north of the village, with a number of national races being held there. The current series - The Caersws Cup - began in March 2009.

Cymru Alliance club Caersws F.C. are based in the village, and play their home matches at the Recreation Ground.

Caersws is home to current and past champions of a number of sporting disciplines, leading some to christen it the "Sporting Capital of Wales".

Notable people
 John Ceiriog Hughes (1832–1887), a Welsh poet and collector of Welsh folk tunes; also stationmaster and manager of the Van Railway from 1868 to 1887; buried in the churchyard at Llanwnnog.
 Mart Watkins (1880–1942), footballer with 161 club caps and 10 for Wales.
 Derek A. Traversi (1912–2005), a literary critic mainly for the British Council
 Phil Woosnam (1932–2013), former NASL commissioner and footballer with over 370 club caps and 17 for Wales.

Gallery

See also
Welsh Marches

References

Literature
 Stephenson D. (2014), The Medieval Borough of Caersws: Origins and Decline, The Montgomeryshire Collections, Vol. 102, 103–109.

External links

6 pages of artifacts and documents associated with Caersws and held on Gathering the Jewels the website of Welsh cultural history 
www.geograph.co.uk : photos of Caersws and surrounding area

 
Communities in Powys
Montgomeryshire
Victorian Montgomeryshire Parishes